Catch Us If You Can is an Australian game and prank television series which ran for 30 episodes on the Seven Network in 1981. It consisted of games for members of the studio audience and pre-recorded pranks, modelled after Candid Camera. The pranks were usually on unsuspecting members of the public but occasionally on celebrities.

It was produced by Peter Luck and hosted in the studio by Bryan Davies. Regular actors and comedians involved in the pranks included Grant Dodwell, Deborah Gray, Edith Bliss, Ian McRae and Marty Morton.

1980s Australian game shows